Jeffrey William Shaw, QC (10 October 194911 May 2010) was an Australian lawyer, judge and former Attorney General of New South Wales.

Early life and education
Shaw was educated at Boronia Park and Chatswood public schools, and Hunters Hill High School where he was a Sergeant in the school Cadet Corps. He graduated in Arts and Law at the University of Sydney in 1973, and also spent a period studying at Templeton College, Oxford.

He married Elizabeth Bryant on 21 December 1974 and they had two sons.

Legal career
Shaw was admitted as a solicitor of the New South Wales Supreme Court in 1975 and as a barrister of that same court the following year. On 12 November 1986, Shaw was appointed Queen's Counsel. He specialised in industrial law.

Politics
Shaw was a member of the Labor Party (ALP). During the 1970s Shaw was a leading intellectual figure of the NSW ALP left. He frequently contributed to the left's publication Socialist Industrial Labour and later Challenge. With others such as Joan Evatt, Wayne Haylen, Peter Crawford, Laurie Ferguson, and Pam Allan he successfully organised the unprecedented left takeover in NSW Young Labor in 1973–74, becoming Senior Vice President. During this period he was an official of the Public Service Association of NSW and later a solicitor with labor law firm Taylor & Scott.

Shaw was a candidate for the New South Wales Legislative Assembly seat of Eastwood in the 1981 NSW election. He was defeated by the incumbent, veteran Liberal Jim Clough.

Shaw was appointed to fill a casual vacancy in the New South Wales Legislative Council in May 1990, representing the Labor Party. The ALP was in opposition at the time, and Shaw served as Shadow Minister for Industrial Relations and Local Government from 1991 to 1995.

Minister
Upon the election of the ALP to government in March 1995, Shaw became Attorney General and Minister for Industrial Relations, positions he held until 2000. Shaw was also the Minister for Fair Trading from 1998 to 1999. As Attorney-General he led a push in 1996 to censor online information.

Retirement
In 1998 Shaw failed to gain a winnable position on the ticket in left wing preselection for the Upper House. His career was eventually "saved" by the right wing Head Office group who moved him to top of the combined ticket.

Clearly disillusioned with factions, Shaw observed at the launch of the Henry Parkes Foundation on 4 June 1999 that "he (Parkes) helped pioneer the faction system that dogs state politics yet – and last year threatened the career of a brilliant Attorney General". Despite his conflicts with factional figures, however, Shaw was regarded as an "iconic figure" within the ALP.

Shaw retired from the Legislative Council in 2000.

Judicial career
Shaw was sworn in as a Judge of the Supreme Court of New South Wales on 4 February 2003.

Despite Shaw being one of their political opponents, the Coalition Opposition welcomed Shaw's appointment to the Supreme Court and did not accuse the Government of appointing Shaw to this position based on partisanship.
 
 	

On 13 October 2004, Shaw crashed his car into a parked vehicle near his Sydney home. He was taken to hospital, where a blood sample was taken for testing; however, the sample disappeared. Under pressure from the Opposition Liberal Party, the Police Integrity Commission initiated an inquiry into the circumstances of the sample's disappearance.

In November 2004, Shaw voluntarily surrendered a second blood sample (not the sample which disappeared in hospital) to the police, resigning from the Supreme Court on 12 November 2004. He was later charged with negligent driving and driving while drunk. Shaw lost his driving licence for a year and was fined A$3,000.

Shaw served as a Supreme Court justice for 647 days (1 year, 9 months and 8 days).

Post-judicial career
After leaving the bench, Shaw was a director of The People's Solicitors, a Sydney law firm. He returned to the University of Sydney as a part-time lecturer on employment law. He was also an adjunct professor of law at the University of Technology, Sydney, a visiting professor at the University of New South Wales, Deputy Chairman at the Law Reform Commission of New South Wales and a member of the Legal Aid Commission's Panel on Appellate Criminal Law.

Death 
Shaw died on 11 May 2010. as a result of complications from old age.

References

External links
 
The People's Solicitors
 

1949 births
2010 deaths
Judges of the Supreme Court of New South Wales
Members of the New South Wales Legislative Council
Labor Left politicians
Deaths from pneumonia in New South Wales
20th-century King's Counsel
Australian King's Counsel
21st-century King's Counsel
University of Sydney alumni
Academic staff of the University of Sydney
Academic staff of the University of Technology Sydney
Attorneys General of New South Wales
Delegates to the Australian Constitutional Convention 1998
20th-century Australian politicians
Australian Labor Party members of the Parliament of New South Wales